Kjell Christian Ulrichsen (born 18 November 1944) is a Norwegian businessperson.

Along with Erik Must, Ulrichsen established the stock broker Fondsfinans. The two later bought part of the publishing company Gyldendal Norsk Forlag. On 26 November 2008, he sold his shares to Must for NOK 350 per share, even though co-owner Trygve Hegnar, with whom they were in a conflict, had bid NOK 500. Through the company Stabæk Holding he owns Telenor Arena, the home ground of Stabæk Fotball, and was previously one of the club's main owners.

From the age of two until the age of eighteen, Ulrichsen lived at an orphanage. He is cousin of Queen Sonja. He has had a legal conflict with Sandefjord Municipality regarding his property on Yxney at Østerøya regarding him trying to hinder the public their freedom to roam.

References

1944 births
Living people
Norwegian company founders
People from Bærum